The World Bridge Games are held quadrennially. The first two events were held in 2008 and 2012, in Beijing and Lille respectively, as part of the World Mind Sports Games (WMSG), and superseding the World Team Olympiad, which had been held every four years from 1960 to 2004. More than half of the 2008 WMSG participants were bridge players. For 2016, the bridge competitions within the WMSG were hived off as a separate event, held during September that year in Wrocław, Poland.

References 

Contract bridge world competitions